Choli is a village in the Paphos District of Cyprus, located 7 km south of Polis Chrysochous. It is home to three churches: the late fifteenth- to early sixteenth-century Arkhángelos Mikaïl church, the fifteenth-century Panayía Odhiyítria Orthodox church and the twelfth-century St George church.

Nearby 
The east side of the village is connected with the main road of Pafos-Poli Chrisochous, through the village Skoulli. The north side is connected with the village Goudi. In other words, Choli is only 2 kilometers away from Goudi and 1.5 kilometers away from Skoulli, which is actually the bridge of communication with Pafos.

Climate
The average rainfall here is 580 mm annually.

References

Communities in Paphos District